Richard Marvin may refer to:

 Richard P. Marvin (1803–1892), American lawyer and politician from New York
 Richard Marvin (composer), American film composer